The Prince of Pep is a 1925 American silent romantic drama film directed by Jack Nelson and starring Richard Talmadge.

Plot
As described in a film magazine review, a young doctor is struck on the head by his secretary and the injury causes him to forget his identity. He lives as a wharf tramp until he meets the daughter of another doctor and helps her and her father minister to the poor. Later he is struck on the head again and becomes aware of his identity. He also wins the affection of the young woman.

Cast

Preservation
Prints of The Prince of Pep are held by the Library of Congress, Cinematheque Royale de Belgique, and Academy Film Archive.

References

External links
 
 

1925 films
Films directed by Jack Nelson
Film Booking Offices of America films
Silent American Western (genre) films
1920s American films
1920s English-language films